Toyvo Antikaynen was a merchant ship of Black Sea Shipping Company (Soviet Union), tweendecker type general cargo ship, project B401. This ship is one of the Kommunist-class cargo ships. The ship was named in honor of the Finnish communist leader and the Red Army officer Toivo Antikainen.

Only two ships of Kommunist-class cargo ships had additional figure in the built number (shipyard number). That were Djuzeppe di Vittorio (number B40/101 - B40/91) and Toyvo Antikaynen (number B40/102 - B40/92). Can be it was due to this two ships were built by another shipyard in Poland, and other Kommunist class cargo ships.

Final years
The ship Toyvo Antikaynen was scrapped in 1999 at Calcuta, India. She was one of the last scrapped Kommunist-class ships.

Gallery

References

See also

 Cold War
 SS Nezhin
 SS Karaganda
 SS Metallurg Anosov
 SS Fizik Kurchatov
 MS Sarny

Kommunist-class cargo ships
1970 ships
Ships built in Gdańsk